List of speakers of the House of Representatives of Trinidad and Tobago.

Below is a list of speakers of the Legislative Assembly 1950–1961:

Below is a list of speakers of the House of Representatives of Trinidad and Tobago:

Footnotes

Sources
  Official website of the Parliament of Trinidad and Tobago

Politics of Trinidad and Tobago
Trinidad and Tobago